This is a list of series released by TVB in 2006.

Top ten drama series in ratings
The following is a list of TVB's top serial dramas in 2006 by average ratings. The list includes premiere week and final week ratings, as well as the average overall count of live Hong Kong viewers (in millions).

First line series
These dramas aired in Hong Kong from 8:00pm to 9:00pm (UTC+8; 8:00pm to 8:30pm from 10 April onwards), Monday to Friday on TVB.

Second line series
These dramas aired in Hong Kong from 9:00pm to 10:00pm (8:30pm to 9:30pm from 10 April onwards), Monday to Friday on TVB.

Third line series
These dramas aired in Hong Kong from 10:00pm to 11:00pm (9:30pm to 10:30pm from 10 April onwards), Monday to Friday on TVB.

Fourth line series
These dramas aired in Hong Kong at 12:05 to 1:15 am, Monday to Friday on TVB.

Weekend Dramas
These dramas aired in Hong Kong from 5:30 to 6:30 pm, Saturday on TVB.

These dramas aired in Hong Kong from 10:30 to 11:15 pm, Saturday on TVB.

Warehoused series
These dramas were released overseas and have not broadcast on TVB Jade Channel.

External links
  TVB.com

References

2006
2006 in Hong Kong television